Al-Taji Sport Club, is an Iraqi football team based in Al-Taji, Baghdad, the team competes in the Iraq Division Two. In 2011 the team has played one season in Iraqi Premier League.

Stadium
Currently the team plays at the 5000 capacity Al Taji Stadium.

References

External links
 Al-Taji SC on Soccerway.com
 Al-Taji SC on Goalstream.org

Football clubs in Iraq
Football clubs in Baghdad